The 1895 Preakness Stakes was the 20th running of the $1,000 added Preakness Stakes, a horse race for three-year-old Thoroughbreds run on May 25, 1895 at Gravesend Race Track, in Coney Island, New York. Ridden by Fred Taral, Belmar won the mile and a sixteen race by one length over runner-up April Fool. The race was run on a track rated fast in a final time of 1:50 1/2.

Bred by James Galway at his Preakness Stud in Passaic County, New Jersey, he raced under the nom de course Preakness Stables.

In 1895, the Kentucky Derby was run on May 6, 1895 and the Preakness Stakes twenty days later on May 25. When the New York Jockey Club ceased operations, the running of the Belmont Stakes was delayed until November 2 once the Westchester Racing Association took over the racetrack.  

The 1919 Preakness Stakes would mark the first time the race would be recognized as the second leg of a U.S. Triple Crown series.

The full chart 

 Winning Breeder: Preakness Stud; (NJ)

External links

References 

1895
Gravesend Race Track
1895 in horse racing
1895 in American sports
1895 in sports in New York City
Horse races in New York City